Ellipsoptera sperata is a species of flashy tiger beetle in the family Carabidae. It is found in Central America and North America.

Subspecies
These three subspecies belong to the species Ellipsoptera sperata:
 Ellipsoptera sperata inquisitor (Casey, 1897)
 Ellipsoptera sperata sperata (LeConte, 1856)
 Ellipsoptera sperata vauriei (Cazier, 1954)

References

Further reading

 

Cicindelidae
Articles created by Qbugbot
Beetles described in 1856